Bring Me Home: Live 2011 is the fifth video album and second live release by English band Sade, released on 22 May 2012 by RCA Records. It was filmed at Citizens Business Bank Arena in Ontario, California, on 4 September 2011 during the band's Sade Live concert tour. The DVD and Blu-ray contain 21 tracks, as well as rare glimpses of behind-the-stage scenes with a 20-minute documentary, exclusive candid moments, a short technical documentary by Stuart Matthewman, and outtakes from the crew. The CD that accompanies the DVD release includes 13 tracks. A deluxe bundle containing both the audio and video of the concert was released on iTunes.

Bring Me Home: Live 2011 debuted at number one on the US Top Music Videos chart. It was nominated for Best Long Form Music Video at the 2013 Grammy Awards.

Track listing

Personnel
Credits adapted from the liner notes of Bring Me Home: Live 2011.

Sade
 Sade Adu – vocals
 Stuart Matthewman – guitar, saxophone
 Andrew Hale – keyboards
 Paul S. Denman – bass

Additional musicians
 Leroy Osbourne – vocals, guitar
 Tony Momrelle – vocals
 Pete Lewinson – drums
 Ryan Waters – guitar
 Karl Vanden Bossche – percussion

Technical
 Sophie Muller – film direction, film production, editing
 Grant Jue – film production
 Roger Davies – film production
 Mike Pela – DVD audio mix engineering
 Mazen Murad – mastering
 Steven Chivers – director of photography
 Tom Russell – colourist
 Sade Adu – editing
 Steve Rees – editing

Artwork
 Jeri Heiden – package design

Charts

Weekly charts

Year-end charts

Certifications

Release history

References

2012 live albums
2012 video albums
Epic Records live albums
Epic Records video albums
Live video albums
RCA Records live albums
RCA Records video albums
Sade (band) live albums